Ruth-Marie Stewart (April 28, 1927 – March 10, 2012) was an American alpine skier. She competed in two events at the 1948 Winter Olympics.

References

External links
 

1927 births
2012 deaths
American female alpine skiers
Olympic alpine skiers of the United States
Alpine skiers at the 1948 Winter Olympics
Sportspeople from Brooklyn
21st-century American women